Nassim Hnid (born 12 March 1997) is a Tunisian professional footballer who plays as a centre-back for Lithuanian club Žalgiris.

Career
On 20 August 2020, Hnid joined Super League Greece club AEK Athens. AEK Athens reportedly paid a transfer fee of €600,000 to CS Sfaxien, while Hnid signed a four-year contract.

Career statistics

References

Living people
1997 births
People from Zarzis
Tunisian footballers
Association football central defenders
Tunisia international footballers
2019 Africa Cup of Nations players
Tunisian Ligue Professionnelle 1 players
Super League Greece players
CS Sfaxien players
AEK Athens F.C. players
FK Žalgiris players
Tunisian expatriate footballers
Tunisian expatriate sportspeople in Greece
Expatriate footballers in Greece
Tunisian expatriate sportspeople in Lithuania
Expatriate footballers in Lithuania